Truronian is an English coach operator based in Cornwall. It is owned and operated by First South West, a subsidiary of FirstGroup. Previously, it also had a bus operation and a holiday business.

History
Truronian was formed in September 1987 by former Western National managers Ken Branchett, David Rabey, and Geoff Rumbles. In 1988, the business of Flora Motors, Helston, was purchased, followed in 1993 by CR Williams Coaches, St Agnes.

Services operated included park and ride services for the Eden Project and express services for National Express.

In April 2008, Truroninan was purchased by FirstGroup with 50 buses and 20 coaches and integrated into its First Devon & Cornwall operation.

The holiday business ceased in November 2011. In March 2012, the trading name was sold to Newell's Travel, which now produce, organise, and operate a British, Irish and Continental Holidays programme still under the Truronian banner.

References

External links
Truronian - Cornwall's Coach Company
Truronian former website
First Cornwall website

Coach operators in England
Companies based in Cornwall
FirstGroup bus operators in England
Former bus operators in Cornwall
Transport companies established in 1987
Truro
1987 establishments in England